Denis Zachaire (1510–1556) is the pseudonym of a 16th-century alchemist who spent his life and family fortune in a futile search for the Philosopher's Stone and the Elixir of Life.

Pursuit of alchemy
Born in 1510 to a noble and ancient family of Guienne, Zachaire was sent to school at a young age in Bordeaux under the care of a tutor hired by the family. The tutor was obsessed with alchemy and the Magnum Opus, and Zachaire quickly found himself caught up in the hysteria, pouring vast amounts of his parents' money into the mystic crucible.

Laboring tirelessly in smoke-filled chambers, Zachaire and his tutor spent over 200 crowns and his parents reduced his allowance. After returning home to mortgage his inheritance, Zachaire took up with a "Philosopher" and later with a monk, both of whom helped him spend whatever gold he had left.

In 1550, Zachaire claimed to transmute base metal into gold.

References

Further reading
 Tenney L. Davis, "The Autobiography of Denis Zachaire", in Isis, nov. 1925, vol. 8, 2 pp. 287–299.
 E. J. Holmyard, L'Alchimie, trad. Arthaud, 1979, p. 264–270.
 Armand Lattes, Un alchimiste gascon : Denis Zachaire (1510–1556), Académie des Sciences, Inscriptions et Belles-Lettres de Toulouse, Série 18, Tome 5, Vol. 166, 5 décembre 2004, pp. 25–28.
 Renan Crouvizier, L'authenticité de l'opuscule attribué à maistre D.Zecaire, Chrysopoeia, n° I, Collège de France, 1995.

External links
Profile at alchemywebsite.com

1510 births
1556 deaths
French alchemists
People from Aquitaine
16th-century pseudonymous writers
16th-century alchemists